Ondina scandens is a species of sea snail, a marine gastropod mollusk in the family Pyramidellidae, the pyrams and their allies.

Description
The shell grows to a length of 3 mm.

Distribution
This species occurs in the following locations:
 Mediterranean Sea : Greece, Italy, North Africa.

References

 Templado, J. and R. Villanueva 2010 Checklist of Phylum Mollusca. pp. 148–198 In Coll, M., et al., 2010. The biodiversity of the Mediterranean Sea: estimates, patterns, and threats. PLoS ONE 5(8):36pp.

External links
 To Biodiversity Heritage Library (2 publications)
 To CLEMAM
 To Encyclopedia of Life
 To World Register of Marine Species
 Gastropods.com: Ondina scandens scandens; retrieved: 26 January 2012

Pyramidellidae
Gastropods described in 1884